Jakob Egholm (born 27 April 1998) is a Danish cyclist, who currently rides for UCI WorldTeam .

Major results

2016
 1st  Road race, UCI Junior Road World Championships
 2nd Overall Trophée Center Morbihan
1st Stage 1
2018
 7th Skive–Løbet
 7th Eschborn–Frankfurt Under–23
2019
 4th Road race, National Under-23 Road Championships

References

External links

1998 births
Living people
Danish male cyclists
People from Holbæk Municipality
Sportspeople from Region Zealand